Mant Assembly constituency is one  of the 403 constituencies of the Uttar Pradesh Legislative Assembly,  India. It is a part of the Mathura district and one  of the five assembly constituencies in the Mathura Lok Sabha constituency. First election in this assembly constituency was held in  2012 after the "Delimitation of Parliamentary and Assembly  Constituencies Order, 2008" was passed and the constituency was formed  in 2008. The constituency is assigned identification number 82.

Wards  / Areas

Extent  of Mant Assembly constituency is PCs Falain-II, Jatawari, Barha, Husaini,  Rampur of Paigaon KC, PCs Ujhani, Shergarh, Peerpur, Dhimri, Ranhera, Senwa,  Astadi & Gulalpur of Chhata KC of Chhata Tehsil; KCs Nauhjhil, Surir, Bhidauni,  Akabarpur, Harnaul, Mant & Bajana NP of Mant Tehsil.

Members of the Legislative Assembly

Election results

2022

2012 election

See also

Mathura district
Mathura Lok Sabha constituency
Sixteenth Legislative Assembly of Uttar Pradesh
Uttar Pradesh Legislative Assembly

References

External links
 

Assembly constituencies of Uttar Pradesh
Mathura district
Constituencies established in 2008